Tsereg River is a river of Mongolia. It is a tributary of the Tes River.

Rivers of Mongolia